Sim Ui-gyeom (1535–1587) was a Korean philosopher and politician during the Joseon Dynasty. A Neo-Confucian scholar, he was the head of the Westerner political faction. Sim was also the younger brother of Queen Insun and a member of the Cheongsong Sim clan (청송 심씨, 靑松 沈氏). Through his father, Sim is a 4th great-grandson of Sim On, a great-great-great-grandnephew of Queen Soheon and eventually became the 5th great-granduncle of Queen Danui.

Family 
 Great-Great-Great-Great-Great-Grandfather
 Sim Deok-bu (심덕부, 沈德符; 1328 – 1401)
 Great-Great-Great-Great-Great-Grandmother
 Lady Kim (김씨, 金氏)
 Great-Great-Great-Great-Grandfather 
 Sim On (심온, 沈溫; 1375 – 18 January 1419): Queen Soheon's father (Queen Consort of King Sejong)
 Great-Great-Great-Great-Grandmother
 Grand Internal Princess Consort of the Sunheung Ahn clan (삼한국대부인 순흥 안씨, 三韓國大夫人 順興 安氏)
 Great-Great-Great-Grandfather
 Sim Hoe (심회, 沈澮; 1418 – 1493): Queen Soheon's younger brother
 Great-Great-Great-Grandmother 
 Lady Kim of the Wonju Kim clan (정경부인 원주 김씨, 貞敬夫人 原州 金氏) 
 Great-Great-Grandfather
 Sim Won (심원, 沈湲)
 Great-Great-Grandmother 
 Lady Yi of the Jeonju Yi clan (정경부인 전주 이씨)
 Great-Grandfather
 Sim Sun-mun (심순문, 沈順文)
 Great-Grandmother 
 Lady Sin of the Pyeongsan Sin clan (정경부인 평산 신씨, 貞敬夫人 平山 申氏)
 Grandfather
 Sim Yeon-won (심연원, 沈連源; 1491 – 1558)
 Grandmother
 Lady Kim of the Gyeongju Kim clan (정경부인 경주 김씨, 貞敬夫人 慶州 金氏) 
 Father
 Sim Gang (심강, 沈鋼; 1514 – 1567)
 Mother 
 Internal Princess Consort Wansan of the Jeonju Yi clan (완산부부인 전주 이씨, 完山府夫人 全州 李氏; 1512 – 1559)
 Grandfather – Yi Dae, Prince Jeonseong (전성군 이대, 全城君 李薱; 21 July 1488 – 29 October 1543)
 Grandmother – Lady Jeong of the Dongnae Jeong clan (동래 정씨; ? – 9 January 1557)
 Uncle – Yi Ryang (이량, 李梁; 17 November 1519 – 8 March 1583)
 Siblings
 Older sister – Queen Insun of the Cheongsong Sim clan (인순왕후 심씨, 仁順王后 沈氏; 27 June 1532 – 12 February 1575)
 Brother-in-law – Yi Hwan, King Myeongjong (경원대군 이환; 3 July 1534 – 3 August 1567)
 Nephew – Yi Bu, Crown Prince Sunhoe (순회세자 이부; 1 July 1551 – 6 October 1563)
 Adoptive nephew – Yi Yeon, King Seonjo (선조; 26 November 1552 – 16 March 1608)
 Older brother – Sim In-gyeom (심인겸, 沈仁謙; 1533 – 1580)
 Sister-in-law – Lady Lee (이씨)
 Nephew – Sim Eom (심엄, 沈㤿); became the adoptive son of Sim Ui-gyeom
 Niece-in-law – Lady Gu of the Neungseong Gu clan (능성 구씨, 綾城 具氏)
 Younger brother – Sim Ye-gyeom (심예겸, 沈禮謙; 1537 – 1587)
 Sister-in-law – Lady Jeong of the Yeonil Jeong clan (연일 정씨)
 Younger brother – Sim Ji-gyeom (심지겸, 沈智謙; 1540 – 1568)
 Sister-in-law – Lady Lee (이씨)
 Sister-in-law – Lady Heo (허씨)
 Nephew – Sim Gyeong (심경, 沈憬)
 Younger brother – Sim Sin-gyeom (심신겸, 沈信謙; 1542 – 1596)
 Sister-in-law – Lady Jeong (정씨)
 Nephew – Sim Yul (심율, 沈慄)
 Nephew – Sim Gak (심각, 沈恪)
 Nephew – Sim Yi (심이, 沈怡)
 Niece – Lady Sim of the Cheongsong Sim clan (청송 심씨, 靑松 沈氏)
 Niece – Lady Sim of the Cheongsong Sim clan (청송 심씨, 靑松 沈氏)
 Niece – Lady Sim of the Cheongsong Sim clan (청송 심씨, 靑松 沈氏)
 Niece – Lady Sim of the Cheongsong Sim clan (청송 심씨, 靑松 沈氏)
 Younger brother – Sim Chung-gyeom (심충겸, 沈忠謙; 1545 – 1594)
 Sister-in-law – Lady Yi of the Jeonju Yi clan (증 정경부인 전주 이씨)
 Nephew – Sim Heun (심흔, 沈忻)
 Nephew – Sim Yeol (심열, 沈悅; 1569 – 1646); became the adoptive son of Sim Ye-gyeom
 Nephew – Sim Jong (심종, 沈悰)
 Niece – Lady Sim of the Cheongsong Sim clan (청송 심씨)
 Niece – Lady Sim of the Cheongsong Sim clan (청송 심씨)
 Younger brother – Sim Hyo-gyeom (심효겸, 沈孝謙; 20 September 1547 – 24 September 1600)
 Sister-in-law – Lady Nam (남씨)
 Sister-in-law – Lady Yi (이씨)
 Nephew – Sim Pib (심핍, 沈愊)
 Nephew – Sim Cheok (심척, 沈惕)
 Niece – Lady Sim of the Cheongsong Sim clan (청송 심씨)
 Niece – Lady Sim of the Cheongsong Sim clan (청송 심씨)
 Younger brother – Sim Je-gyeom (심제겸, 沈悌謙; 1550 – 1589)
 Sister-in-law – Lady Sin (신씨)
 Nephew – Sim Yu (심유, 沈愉)
 Nephew – Sim Hyeop (심협, 沈協)
 Niece – Lady Sim of the Cheongsong Sim clan (청송 심씨)
 Niece – Lady Sim of the Cheongsong Sim clan (청송 심씨)
 Younger sister – Lady Sim of the Cheongsong Sim clan (청송 심씨)
 Brother-in-law – Im Yeong-ro (임영로, 任榮老) of the Pungcheon Im clan (풍천 임씨)
 Younger sister – Lady Sim of the Cheongsong Sim clan (청송 심씨)
 Brother-in-law – Yi Byeok (이벽, 李鼊) of the Jeonju Yi clan (전주 이씨)
 Wife and children 
 Lady Han of the Cheongju Han clan (정부인 청주 한씨, 貞夫人 淸州 韓氏)
 Son – Sim Non (심논, 沈惀)
Adoptive son – Sim Eom (심엄, 沈㤿); son of Sim In-gyeom 
 Adoptive daughter-in-law – Lady Gu of the Neungseong Gu clan (능성 구씨, 綾城 具氏)
 Daughter – Lady Sim of the Cheongsong Sim clan (청송 심씨); Yun Hwon's first wife
 Son-in-law – Yun Hwon (윤훤, 尹暄) of the Haepyeong Yun clan (해평 윤씨, 海平 尹氏; 1573 – 15 February 1672)
 Grandson – Yun Sun-ji (윤순지, 尹順之; 1591 – 1666)
 Grandson – Yun Won-ji (윤원지, 尹元之)
 Half-Grandson – Yun Jing-ji (윤징지, 尹澄之)
 Half-Grandson – Yun Ui-ji (윤의지, 尹誼之)

See also
 Kim Hyo-won
 Yi Hwang
Queen Soheon
Queen Insun 
Sim On

External links 
 Sim Ui-gyeom 
 Sim Ui-gyeom

References

1535 births
1587 deaths
16th-century Korean philosophers
Joseon scholar-officials
Korean Confucianists
Korean scholars
Neo-Confucian scholars